Jeff Oluoch (born 2 April 1995) is a Kenyan rugby sevens player. He competed in the men's tournament at the 2020 Summer Olympics. He competed for Kenya at the 2022 Rugby World Cup Sevens in Cape Town.

References

External links
 

1995 births
Living people
Male rugby sevens players
Olympic rugby sevens players of Kenya
Rugby sevens players at the 2020 Summer Olympics
Place of birth missing (living people)